Klaus Neumann (born 4 January 1942) is a German athlete. He competed in the men's triple jump at the 1968 Summer Olympics.

References

External links
 

1942 births
Living people
Athletes (track and field) at the 1968 Summer Olympics
German male triple jumpers
Olympic athletes of East Germany
People from Bystrzyca Kłodzka
Sportspeople from Lower Silesian Voivodeship